The 2014 FA WSL was the fourth season of the FA WSL, the top-level women's football league of England. The season began on 30 March and ended on 12 October.

Liverpool L.F.C. are the defending champions from the 2013 FA WSL. The top two teams qualify for the 2015–16 UEFA Women's Champions League.

Beginning in the 2014 season, the WSL added a second division, the WSL 2. Because the divisions are interconnected, WSL 1 teams face the risk of relegation for the first time in the league's history. There is, however, no connection to the third level Women's Premier League, so WSL 2 teams cannot be relegated. WSL 1 consists of eight teams while the WSL 2 is made up of ten.

Starting places in both divisions were granted based on applications sent in by clubs, so Manchester City were able to enter its newly created women's team directly into the WSL 1. The governing body announced it will partially fund teams in the league, awarding £70,000 to clubs in WSL1 and £23,000 in WSL2.

Team changes
 Lincoln Ladies were renamed Notts County Ladies and relocated from Lincoln to Nottingham.
 Barnet were renamed London Bees.
 Durham were a newly formed team admitted to the WSL 2.
 Due to the new format, several movements between various leagues took place.

FA WSL 1

Original FA WSL 2 teams

FA WSL 1

Liverpool retained the title on goal difference, after they and Chelsea finished level on 26 points. Everton were relegated to the WSL 2 for the 2015 season after 21 years as a top flight club.

Table

Results

Top scorers

FA WSL 2

The Doncaster Rovers Belles challenged for promotion until the final day, due to a 2-1 win over Sunderland. Sunderland won the inaugural WSL 2 on the final day, with a 4-0 win over Millwall Lionesses.

Table

Results

Top scorers

FA WSL Cup
The 2014 edition of the FA WSL Cup sees 18 teams play for the title. Teams are divided into three groups of six. The group winners plus the best runners-up advance to the semi-finals. Arsenal are the defending champions. The cup is played along with the season, the first matches are held on 30 April 2014.

Group 1
Arsenal advanced as best runners-up, having more points than the other second placed teams.

Group 2

Group 3

Knockout stage
Semi-finals were drawn after the group stage and not predetermined. All teams play in the WSL 1. Arsenal reached their fourth final in as many years and meet Manchester City.

Final
Wycombe Wanderers' Adams Park was to stage the final match. The match was broadcast live on BT Sport.

References

External links
Official website
Season at soccerway.com
League Cup at soccerway.com

Women's Super League seasons
1
1